Princeton Academy of the Sacred Heart is an independent school for boys in Kindergarten through Grade 8.  Located in Princeton, New Jersey the school is part of the Network of Sacred Heart Schools.

The school is divided into two sections: a Lower School (Kindergarten through Grade 4) and a Middle School (Grade 5 through Grade 8).  As of the 2012–13 school year, the school had an enrollment of 219 students and 27 classroom teachers (on an FTE basis), for a student-teacher ratio of 8:1.

Princeton Academy has been accredited by the Middle States Association of Colleges and Schools since 2003.  It is overseen by the New Jersey Department of Education and is a member of the Network of the Sacred Heart Schools, the National Association of Independent Schools, the New Jersey Association of Independent Schools, the Association of Delaware Valley Independent Schools, the International Boys' Schools Coalition (IBSC), the Council for Spiritual and Ethical Education, the Council for Advancement and Support of Education, and the Educational Records Bureau.

Mission

Princeton Academy's mission is to develop young men with active and creative minds, a sense of understanding and compassion for others, and the courage to act on their beliefs.  The school stresses the total development of each child: spiritual, moral, intellectual, social, emotional, and physical.

The school's philosophy is rooted in the tradition of the Society of the Sacred Heart, which educates children to become leaders of a just society by adhering to the following five goals:

A personal and active faith in God
A deep respect for intellectual values
A social awareness which impels to action
The building of community as a Christian value
Personal growth in an atmosphere of wise freedom

Academics
The instruction at Princeton Academy is designed to build on skills and knowledge gained in the preceding grades, in a way both developmentally appropriate and progressively challenging.

Lower School curriculum

Language Arts

The foundation of the Princeton Academy language arts curriculum is the belief that language arts are integral to the learning process of any subject at any level.  Boys at Princeton Academy have ample opportunity and time to read and write independently, as well as to experience excellent modeling of reading and writing. The Junior Great Books program assists in reinforcing high-level comprehension skills. The Lower School also employs Word Journeys and Words Their Way, developmental spelling and phonics programs based on the philosophy that understanding of the printed word occurs in clear stages. Instruction is designed to meet the specific needs of each boy.  Handwriting Without Tears meets the fine motor needs of boys through its clear, simple letter formation and interactive learning style.

Science and mathematics

Everyday Math emphasizes a balance between learning concepts, skills, and problem solving. In each grade level, content is divided into six strands: number and numeration, operations and computation, data and chance, measurement, geometry and patterns, functions, and algebra.

Through FOSS inquiry-based science, the boys develop skills of observation, documentation, data collection, and data analysis. Curriculum connections to science and social studies units that are studied in the regular classroom assist in developing content knowledge through varied means.

Foreign language

Students are introduced to Spanish beginning in Kindergarten, and by third grade are attending classes four days a week for 30 minutes.  Instruction occurs through games, songs, and literature, with a focus on conversational skills.  Students are gradually introduced to the printed word and in third grade begin to read and write in Spanish.

Other subjects
All Princeton Academy students attend religion, music, art, and physical education for two periods a week.

Middle School Curriculum

The Middle School program consists of five core academic subjects: English, mathematics, science, social studies, and Spanish. There are four special subjects: religion, music, art, and physical education.

English

The English program promotes an understanding and appreciation of literature and strengthens basic writing skills. Students read and study fiction of various genres, non-fiction, short stories from the Junior Great Books program, plays, poetry, and films. In response to literature, students acquire thinking, planning, drafting, and editing skills through expository, narrative, and creative writing. Students also continue to study English grammar, spelling, and vocabulary.

Mathematics

The Middle School mathematics program uses the University of Chicago Mathematics Project. This program uses a multi-dimensional approach emphasizing skills, properties, uses, and representations.  The program stresses problem solving and the use of real-life applications.

Science

The science program promotes an active learning process where students build a strong 
knowledge of scientific processes, principles, and ideas, as well as develop inquiry skills for problem solving in both an analytical and creative manner. A highlight of the Princeton Academy science program is the Independent Science Project (ISP).

Social Studies

The social studies program aims to develop and strengthen students’ skills in reading and research, observation and listening, recording and organization, interpretation and analysis, and clarity in written work.  Students are encouraged to think critically, formulate their own opinions about the past, and apply what they have learned to the present day.

Foreign Language

The Middle School Spanish program presents an integrated skills approach to Spanish.  Both receptive (listening and reading) and productive (speaking and writing) proficiencies are developed.  Students in Princeton Academy's 8th grade participate in the International Sacred Heart Exchange Program with a Sacred Heart school in Barcelona, the Colegio Sagrado Corazon de Sarria.

Athletics

Princeton Academy offers competitive sports teams for students in the Middle School (grades 5–8).  The mission of the athletic program is to provide opportunities in which students can acquire skills, experience leadership, and grow personally.  All students are encouraged to participate and to learn to balance academics, athletics, and the arts.  The goal of the Athletic Department is to provide a positive experience for the boys on the field of competition.  Every boy, from the novice to the advanced player, has the opportunity to participate in the program.

Princeton Academy offers the following sports:

Fall
Golf
Cross Country
Soccer
Winter
Basketball
Squash
Wrestling
Spring
Baseball
Lacrosse
Tennis

Community service

Princeton Academy embraces the approach of Service Learning.  This is a “teaching and learning strategy that integrates meaningful community service with instruction and reflection to enrich the learning experience, teach civic responsibility, and strengthen communities”. From JK – grade 8, students are involved in community service both for the school community and the community at large, with many of the activities created, designed, and implemented by the boys themselves under faculty guidance.

History

Incorporation

Princeton Academy was incorporated in October 1998 and opened its doors in September 1999 with 34 students in grades K- 3.

Campus

Princeton Academy is located on a 48-acre site approximately 3 miles from downtown Princeton, New Jersey. The Kalkus House, where the admission and administrative offices are located, was built in 1930 by Matthews Construction Company and designed by the architect Rolf Bauhan for Helen and Thomas Dignan. The Dignans owned the house until 1947, at which time it was sold to the Marianites of Holy Cross. The property was called Our Lady of Princeton until it was sold to Princeton Academy of the Sacred Heart in the late 1990s.

The new Athletic and Convocation Center was dedicated in December 2006. The William E. Simon chapel library was designed by Richardson Smith Architects and was dedicated in January 2008. The William E. Simon chapel library features a five-panel silk painting of the Mater created by Princeton-area artist Juanita Yoder. It is customary for schools within the Sacred Heart network to display a painting of the Mater. Princeton Academy's representation of the Mater was inspired by a fresco of the Mater Admirabilis which was created in 1844 and is hanging in the Trinita dei Monti in Rome, Italy.

The Manor House was renamed to the Kalkus House in the spring of 2015 in honor of the then-headmaster, Olen Kalkus.

In 2012 the school began drilling geothermal wells to reduce energy costs.

2012-2014 Renovation

Starting June 2012, the campus became a construction site as the school's so-called Master Plan was carried out. Years of needs assessments, feasibility studies, and financial estimates have translated into a two-phase renovation project that positioned the school for future growth and employed smart energy alternatives to conserve resources. The 2012–13 school year for students started amidst of construction vehicles, high-tech machinery, underground conduits, and demolition crews.  Far from being a distraction, the activity has actually benefitted the boys academically.  Thanks to architects and educators who recognized a unique "teachable moment," students learned first-hand about building, geophysics, and environmental stewardship.

Phase One of the Master Plan called for a complete renovation of one wing of the school and the creation of new lower and middle school classrooms, two science labs, and common spaces.  In addition, a geothermal field is being installed to provide for the school's future cooling and heating needs.  In Phase Two, work was done to move to the school's central wing where new art and music rooms and administrative offices were created.

Green and sustainable features of the project included a geothermal field to more efficiently heat and cool the school, a layer of closed cell spray insulation in exterior walls, insulated glass units in the windows, an updated roof design to allow more natural light and provide space for photovoltaic panels to be placed in the future, and compact fluorescent and LED light fixtures with occupancy sensors in each room.

During construction, classes and administrative offices had been moved around and some had overflowed into the Manor House, but with completion in the Fall of 2013, students, faculty, and staff moved back into the renovated space.

Green Initiatives/Sustainability

Since its beginning, Princeton Academy has kept stewardship of the environment at the forefront of its growth and development.  It has achieved this in a variety of ways.  Princeton Academy challenged the "required" number of paved parking spaces for the school, with the result being that rather than have a giant parking lot on the beautiful campus, grassy areas could be retained and used as temporary spaces during the few times every year when additional parking is needed.  Additionally, Princeton Academy petitioned the Township to minimize the number of lights along the driveway in order to support a "dark sky" philosophy.  Because of these early initiatives, Princeton Academy and the surrounding community benefit from the natural habitats that flourish in large undeveloped meadows and enjoy incredible stargazing from the campus.

Princeton Academy's science program has a strong emphasis on understanding the environment and ecosystems.  Recent building and renovation projects have provided a wealth of hands-on, on-site science lessons, including a greenhouse designed to be a stand-alone structure requiring no man-made heating input.  It works by facing south and absorbing heat into a tank of water during the day and releasing that heat at night.  The Athletic and Convocation Center was built with an asymmetrical roof with a much larger area facing south, upon which solar panels can be placed in the future.  It was built as deep into the ground as possible to take advantage of heat transfer, and, due to large windows on the north wall, uses mainly natural light during the day.

Renovation and construction have heavily influenced design choices and plans.  The 2012–13 school year began while 40 geothermal wells were being drilled on campus which, when connected, will allow the school to cut back drastically on the carbon footprint of its HVAC.  One wing of the school building has a redesigned roofline to allow for larger north facing windows and a sloped roof to the south which provides greater surface area for solar panels. Data from both the geothermal wells and the school's lighting system appears on a dashboard in a common area so the school community can track energy usage and level savings that result from adjustments to use.

References 

Schools in Princeton, New Jersey
1998 establishments in New Jersey
Educational institutions established in 1998
Boys' schools in New Jersey
New Jersey Association of Independent Schools
Private elementary schools in New Jersey
Private middle schools in New Jersey
Private schools in Mercer County, New Jersey
Roman Catholic Diocese of Trenton
Catholic elementary schools in New Jersey
Sacred Heart schools in the United States